Jamie Soule (born 26 November 2000) is an English professional footballer who plays as a striker for Alvechurch  He has also represented England at youth level.

Career

West Bromwich Albion
Soule joined West Bromwich Albion as an eight-year-old and progressed throughout Albion's youth system. Soule signed his first professional contract in 2017 before continuing to play at Premier League 2 level. Soule was assigned the 32 jersey for the Baggies' 2020-21 season. In June 2022 Soule was released by West Bromwich Albion.

Barrow A.F.C. (loan)
On 12 February 2020, Soule joined Barrow A.F.C. on a one month loan deal, making two appearances for the Cumbrian side.

Lincoln City (loan)
On 6 October 2020, it was announced that he had joined Lincoln City on a short-term loan deal. He made his debut the same evening in an EFL Trophy game against Mansfield, and scored the opening goal. He would make his first league appearance coming off the bench against Doncaster Rovers on 31 October 2020. He would only make the two outings for Lincoln City before suffering a knee injury keeping him out until the new year.

Cheltenham Town (loan)
On 31 January 2022, Soule joined League One side Cheltenham Town on loan until the end of the 2021–22 season.

Alvechurch

After his release by West Bromwich Albion in the Summer of 2022. Soule signed for Alvechurch

Statistics

References

2000 births
Living people
English footballers
Association football forwards
England youth international footballers
West Bromwich Albion F.C. players
Barrow A.F.C. players
Lincoln City F.C. players
Cheltenham Town F.C. players
English Football League players